Jeff Doyle (born 1 October 1967) is a former professional rugby league footballer who played in the 1980s and 1990s. He played for the Newcastle Knights from 1988 to 1991, the North Sydney Bears from 1992 to 1993 and finally the Western Reds from 1995 to 1997.

References

External links

Australian rugby league players
North Sydney Bears players
Western Reds players
Newcastle Knights players
Living people
Rugby league centres
1967 births
Place of birth missing (living people)